Uracanthini is a tribe of beetles in the subfamily Cerambycinae, containing the single genus Uracanthus and the single species Uracanthus strigosus.

References

Cerambycinae
Monotypic beetle genera